Sevas Hanum (died May 1990), was a Greek singer. Her real name was Sevasti Papadopoulou and she became popular in the 1950s and 1960s by singing oriental songs.
She was engaged to Stelios Kazantzidis, with whom she worked.

Year of birth missing
1990 deaths
21st-century Greek women singers